CKVV-FM is a Canadian radio station broadcasting an adult hits format on the frequency of 97.5 MHz (FM) in Kemptville, Ontario. The station is branded as 97.5 Moose FM.

History
On December 13, 2010, the Haliburton Broadcasting Group applied to operate a new FM radio station in Kemptville at 97.5 MHz. This application received CRTC approval on April 21, 2011.

Launches as Star FM

The station is Kemptville's first local commercial FM radio station. The station launched on February 27, 2012. The station was branded as Star 97.5.

It is also the third English-language AC station serving the National Capital Region; the others are CJMJ-FM and CJWL-FM.

On April 23, 2012 Vista Broadcast Group, which owns a number of radio stations in western Canada, announced a deal to acquire Haliburton Broadcasting, in cooperation with Westerkirk Capital. The transaction was approved by the CRTC on October 19, 2012.

Juice FM

On September 9, 2014, the station changed its branding to Juice FM with a variety hits format.

Moose FM
On October 23, 2020, the station once again changed its branding to 97.5 Moose FM retaining its variety hits format.

Technical Issues
The station may receive interference from a 97 kilowatt radio station, WFRY, out of Watertown, New York. The 97.5 FM frequency was also used for a low-power tourism station in Ottawa with the call sign VF2516.

References

External links
97.5 Moose FM
www.vistaradio.ca

Kkv
Kkv
Kvv
Radio stations established in 2012
2012 establishments in Ontario